Monique Rutler (born 2 February 1941) is a French-Portuguese director, screenwriter and film editor.

Life and career 
Rutler was born in Mulhouse, in the Haut-Rhin department. After the death of her father she moved to Portugal with her mother. She studied filmmaking at the Instituto das Novas Profissões and at the Lisbon Theatre and Film School. She started her career as a film editor and later as an assistant of prominent directors including José Nascimento and António de Macedo.

After directing some documentaries, Rutler made her feature film debut in 1981, with Velhos São os Trapos. Her films are characterized by strong female main characters, and often deal with machismo. In 2019 she was awarded a Career Prize at the Porto Femme - International Film Festival.

Selected filmography 

 Velhos São os Trapos (1981)
 Jogo de Mão (1983)
 O Carro da Estrela (1989)
 Solo de Violino (1990)

References

External links
 

1941 births
Living people
Mass media people from Mulhouse
Portuguese screenwriters
French screenwriters
Portuguese film directors
French film directors
Portuguese film editors
French film editors
Lisbon Theatre and Film School alumni